Rona McLeod is an Australian actress, noted for her television appearances.

She appeared as pregnant inmate Jeannie Stanton in Prisoner, had a recurring role in Neighbours during 1990 and 1991 as Felicity Brent, completely unrecognisable from her appearance in Prisoner, and later played Barbara Fisher in Home and Away.

External links
 

Australian television actresses
Living people
Year of birth missing (living people)